Raúl González Tuñón (29 March 1905 – 14 August 1974) was an Argentine poet and writer from Buenos Aires. He also worked as a journalist, notably for the journal Crítica, and was known for his social activism and his socialist beliefs. He was a great friend of the Chilean poet and Nobel laureate Pablo Neruda. His first book of poetry, El violín del diablo, was published by the well-known Buenos Aires publishing house Editorial Gleizer in 1926, and Gleizer then published many of his later works.

1905 births
1974 deaths
20th-century Argentine poets
20th-century Argentine male writers
Argentine male poets